Joseph Thorarinn Thorson,  (March 15, 1889 – July 6, 1978) was a lawyer and politician from Winnipeg, Manitoba, Canada.

He was a Rhodes Scholar, and a veteran of World War I.

He was the Liberal Member of Parliament for the ridings of Winnipeg South Centre (1926—1930) and Selkirk (1935—1942). From 1941 to 1942, he was the Minister of National War Services in the cabinet of William Lyon Mackenzie King.

In 1942, he was made President of the Exchequer Court of Canada.

Cartoonist Charles Thorson was his younger brother.

Electoral history

References
 
 Joseph Thorarinn Thorson fonds, Library and Archives Canada

1889 births
1978 deaths
Liberal Party of Canada MPs
Members of the House of Commons of Canada from Manitoba
Members of the King's Privy Council for Canada
Thorson, Joseph Thorarinn
Judges of the Exchequer Court of Canada